Alvorada (sunrise in Portuguese) is a city in Rio Grande do Sul, Brazil. It may also refer to:

 Alvorada (film), a 1962 documentary film
 Alvorada, Tocantins, a Brazilian municipality
 Alvorada d'Oeste, a Brazilian municipality
 Alvorada de Minas, a Brazilian municipality
 Alvorada do Norte, Brazil municipality
 Palácio da Alvorada, a presidential palace
 Simca Alvorada, an automobile